Edge of the Century is the twelfth studio album by Styx, released in 1990. It was the first Styx album featuring A&M solo artist Glen Burtnik, the only album to feature the Dennis DeYoung/James Young/Glen Burtnik/Chuck Panozzo/John Panozzo lineup, and the last album to feature John Panozzo on drums before his death in 1996.

The album spawned three singles. "Show Me the Way" was written by DeYoung and peaked at #3 on both the Hot 100 Pop Singles Chart and Adult Contemporary Chart. Some radio stations played a version edited with snippets of congressional debate and caller dedications to troops in the Gulf War. "Love Is the Ritual", (Pop singles peak #80) written by Burtnik and Plinky Giglio, and "Love at First Sight", (Pop singles chart peak, #25) written by Burtnik, DeYoung and Young, were also released as singles, but neither garnered the same amount of success as "Show Me the Way".

The album sold more than 500,000 copies and was certified gold by the RIAA.

Edge of the Century would be Styx's last album of new music for A&M Records and due to poor album sales, A&M did not renew their contract.

Track listing

Personnel

Styx 
 Dennis DeYoung – vocals, keyboards, accordion
 James "JY" Young – guitars, vocals
 Glen Burtnik – guitars, vocals
 Chuck Panozzo – bass guitar
 John Panozzo – drums, percussion

Additional personnel 
 Salvatore "Plinky" Giglio – sequencing (1)
 Gary Fry – Synclavier programming (4)
 Terry Fryer – sound effects (9)
 Howard Levy – harmonica
 Joe Pusateri – percussion
 Ronald Kolber – baritone saxophone
 Jon Negus – clarinet, saxophones, horn arrangements (10)
 Michael Smith – saxophones 
 Mike Halpin – trombone
 Danny Barber – trumpet
 Mark Ohlson – trumpet
 Mac Bialystock – horn arrangements (10)

Production 
 Dennis DeYoung – producer, mixing 
 Phil Bonanno – engineer, mixing 
 Chris Shepard – second engineer
 Plinky Giglio – additional engineer (1)
 Ted Jensen – mastering at Sterling Sound, NYC
 Hugh Syme – art direction, design 
 Mark Hauser – photography

Charts
Album - Billboard (United States)

Singles - Billboard (United States)

References

1990 albums
A&M Records albums
Styx (band) albums